Contender is the debut studio album by American pop punk band Forever Came Calling. It was released on July 24, 2012, via Pure Noise Records.

Track listing

References

2012 debut albums
Forever Came Calling albums
Pure Noise Records albums